is a Japanese voice actress.

Notable voice roles

Bastard!! as Obaba
Cardcaptor Sakura as Yukie Kimura
Coji-Coji as Tanuki
Dai-Guard
Di Gi Charat as Coo Erhard
Di Gi Charat - A Trip to the Planet as Coo Erhard
Di Gi Charat Christmas Special as Coo Erhard
Di Gi Charat Natsuyasumi Special as Coo Erhard
Di Gi Charat Nyo as Coo Erhard
Di Gi Charat Ohanami Special as Coo Erhard
Di Gi Charat Summer Special as Coo Erhard
Digimon Tamers as Kai Urazoe
Dragon Drive as Gokaku
Galaxy Angel A as Malibu Peirou
Galaxy Angel X as Malibu Peirou
Gunslinger Girl as Emilio
Juvenile Orion as Tsukasa Amou
Khronos Gear as Napo=Leo
Leave it to Piyoko! as Coo Erhard
Magical Shopping Arcade Abenobashi as Satoshi Imamiya
Magical Witchland as Nonononn
Magical Play 3D as Nonononn
Master of Mosquiton '99 as boy (ep 22); child (ep 23); housewife (ep 2)
Millennium Actress
Mon Colle Knights as Mondo Ooya
Mouse as Machiko Tsukioka
Neppu Kairiku Bushi Road as Hashiba Hinata
Ojamajo Doremi as Igarashi-senpai
Ojamajo Doremi as Akatsuki
Outlaw Star as Lady (ep 2)
Petite Princess Yucie as Cube
Reiwa no Di Gi Charat as Coo Erhard
Sol Bianca: The Legacy as Jani
A Little Snow Fairy Sugar as Salt
A Little Snow Fairy Sugar Summer Special as Salt
The Melody of Oblivion as Solo
Very Private Lesson as Kojishi

References

External links
 

Japanese voice actresses
1973 births
Living people
People from Osaka Prefecture